Malovolchanka is a rural locality (a selo) and the administrative center of Malovolchansky Selsoviet, Krutikhinsky District, Altai Krai, Russia. The population was 611 as of 2013. There are 5 streets.

Geography 
Malovolchanka is located 46 km northwest of Krutikha (the district's administrative centre) by road. Volchno-Burlinskoye is the nearest rural locality.

References 

Rural localities in Krutikhinsky District